The European Baptist Federation (EBF) is a federation of 59 Baptist associations and is one of six regional fellowships in the Baptist World Alliance. The headquarters is in Amsterdam, Netherlands.

History
The EBF was founded in Ruschlikon, Switzerland, in 1949. That same year, it participated in the founding of the International Baptist Theological Study Centre in Ruschlikon, Switzerland. It lays a great deal of emphasis on human rights, religious liberty and aid programs. According to a denomination census released in 2022, it claimed 59 member denominations in 52 countries, 24,000 churches and 800,000 members.

See also
 Bible
 Born again
 Baptist beliefs
 List of Baptist confessions
 List of Baptist World Alliance National Fellowships
 Jesus Christ
 Believers' Church

References

External links
European Baptist Federation - Official Web Site

Christian organizations established in 1949
Baptist denominations in Europe
Baptist denominations established in the 20th century
1949 establishments in Switzerland